Metal Open Air (also known simply as MOA) was an unsuccessful 2012 heavy metal festival. It took place between 20–22 April, at the Parque Independência, 25 km southeast from downtown São Luís, Maranhão, northeastern Brazil. Due to problems with the payment of artists and the accommodation and security of the audience, the festival was ultimately cancelled on its last day.

Background and official line-up 
Originally, it was supposed to be a Brazilian version of the famous German Wacken Open Air. However, the promoters failed to obtain official permission to use the name, so they decided to switch it for Metal Open Air. From that moment on, several bands, including Shaman, Megadeth, Symphony X and Anthrax, started to confirm their performances, though a few have cancelled, including Shadowside, Krisiun, and Volbeat, mostly for logistical reasons.

By February/March 2012, the official announced line-up was as follows (act names in bold are headliners; El Diablo is an entertainment group that prepared rock night parties after every headliner performance):

The headliners of the second day, the Rock and Roll All Stars, were a supergroup composed of Gene Simmons, Joe Elliott, Matt Sorum, Duff McKagan , Gilby Clarke, Glenn Hughes, Ed Roland, Sebastian Bach, Steve Stevens, Mike Inez, Billy Duffy and Charlie Sheen, who was to be the festival's master of ceremonies.

The festival and the cancellations 

Shortly before and even during the festival, several bands cancelled their performances. British thrash band Venom, for example, had their visas sent to Africa instead of Brazil by mistake, thus making it impossible for them to take part of MOA and two other South American festivals. Hansi Kürsch, vocalist for German power metal quartet Blind Guardian, stated:

Aquiles Priester, from Hangar, also cancelled his band's participation, stating:

Terra Prima's members didn't receive their air tickets to São Luís nor the confirmation of their accommodations in the city.

Symphony X, one of the few bands that managed to take on the stage and perform, posted a note some days later, thanking their fans for the show and criticizing the event's structure:

Dave Mustaine, from Megadeth, also thanked his fans and regretted the festival's organization:

Ricardo Confessori, drummer for Shaman, publicly contested Anthrax guitarist Scott Ian for canceling the band's performance at the festival, accusing him of not giving a good excuse for  the fans, to which Ian replied that the problem was "the whole terrible organization. We never want to cancel but they made it impossible."

In the end, a total of 30 of the 47 invited bands cancelled their performances due to the severe logistical, structural and financial problems regarding the festival. As for the fans, some had to camp inside stables, with almost no electricity, lack of places to buy food, beverage and hygiene products and only one public toilet.

Aftermath 
Soon after MOA was cancelled, both companies responsible for the festival (Negri Concerts and Lamparina Filmes e Produções) accused each other of breaking contractual rules.

References 

2012 in Brazil
2012 in music
Rock festivals in Brazil
Heavy metal festivals in Brazil
Cancelled music festivals
Maranhão
Music festivals established in 2012
Music festivals disestablished in 2012
2012 music festivals